Charles Hurel was a French Baroque composer, lutenist and theorbist active between 1665 and 1692.

Biography 
Charles Hurel was a musician and eminent professor from a prosperous family of Parisian luthiers which included some of the main instrumental factors of Paris in the 17th century.

He seems to have been the only member of his family who was also a composer.

He was listed as "ordinary officer of the Academy of Music" in 1684 and as a professor of theorbo in Paris.

A document of 7 April 1676, which gives his signature and that of several other members of his family, describes him as a "lute player".

Among his pupils were Marie Du Port de la Balme and Mademoiselle de Lionne.

He died in Paris c. 1692.

Namesake 
Charles Hurel had a namesake, who died in 1648, who was a master painter and sculptor, active among others in the realization of ceilings painted "à la française".

Works 
 Tablature de luth et de théorbe (c. 1675 or 1680) 

Discography 
 Christopher Wilke: Works for Theorbo - Centaur Records CRC 2875

See also 
 Lute
 Theorbo

References

External links 
 Prélude - Charles Hurel on YouTube
 Charles Hurel on Musicalics

French Baroque composers
French lutenists
17th-century classical composers
Year of birth missing
1690s deaths

Year of death uncertain